Zlogona Gora is a settlement in the Municipality of Oplotnica in eastern Slovenia. It lies on the southern slopes of the Pohorje range northeast of Oplotnica. The area is part of the traditional region of Styria. The municipality is now included in the Drava Statistical Region.

References

External links
Zlogona Gora on Geopedia

Populated places in the Municipality of Oplotnica